Brittany Miller (born July 21, 1987) is an American college softball coach and former pitcher who is the current head coach at Texas A&M–Commerce.  Prior to her position at Texas A&M–Commerce, she served as assistant coach for two seasons at Texas Tech. Prior to that, she was an assistant coach at Loyola Marymount for four seasons. Before her Loyola Marymount years, she was an assistant coach at Iowa State. She began her coaching career at North Dakota State, first as a graduate assistant for two years and an assistant coach for one year.

Playing career

High school
Miller played varsity softball at Pacifica High School in Garden Grove, California. She earned first team all-league, all-county, and all-California Interscholastic Federation (CIF) honors all four years.

College
Miller played softball for the Iowa Hawkeyes softball team from 2006 to 2009. She was named the Hawkeyes Most Valuable Player all four seasons; the only pitcher to do so. She was named an all-Big Ten Conference selection four times. She was named to the NFCA All-Region three years. She was also named Big Ten Pitcher of the Year two times. At the conclusion of her senior season, she was named an NFCA second team All-American.

Professional
Although Miller did not play professionally, she was the seventh player selected in the 2009 National Pro Fastpitch senior draft with the Akron Racers.

Coaching career

Assistant coach
Miller served as assistant coach at four programs. She began her career at North Dakota State as a graduate assistant for the first two years. She was an assistant coach for the Bison in 2012. She served as an assistant coach at Iowa State for the next four years from 2013 to 2016. Following her Iowa State years, she served as an assistant at Loyola Marymount for four years (from 2017–2020).  After Loyola Marymount, she was an assistant coach for the Texas Tech Red Raiders softball program.

Head coach
Miller was named Texas A&M–Commerce head softball coach on June 24, 2022.

See also
Texas A&M–Commerce Lions softball

References

Living people
Softball coaches from California
North Dakota State Bison softball coaches
Iowa State Cyclones softball coaches
Loyola Marymount Lions softball coaches
Texas Tech Red Raiders softball coaches
Texas A&M–Commerce Lions softball coaches
Iowa Hawkeyes softball players
1987 births